Ivan Yevgenyevich Kaspersky is the son of Eugene Kaspersky and Natalya Kaspersky, founders of the malware and anti-virus company Kaspersky. He is also a computer programmer.

He is most famous for his kidnapping by a group of kidnappers who snatched Ivan on his way to a work experience. Ivan was held for $4.5 million ransom.

The Russian Federal Security Service (FSB), working with the Criminal Investigation Bureau of the Moscow Police, combined forces with Kaspersky Lab’s own security personnel. Together they managed to track down where Ivan was being held and take him back. At an interview Eugene said that no ransom was paid.

References

1991 births
Kidnapped Russian people
Computer programmers
Living people